The LaSalle Quartet was a string quartet active from 1946 to 1987. It was founded by first violinist Walter Levin.  The LaSalle's name is attributed to an apartment on LaSalle Street in Manhattan, where some of its members lived during the quartet's inception. The quartet played on a donated set of Amati instruments.

The LaSalle Quartet was best known for its espousal of the Second Viennese School of Schoenberg, Berg and Webern, and of the European modernists who derived from that tradition, though they also performed standard classical and romantic literature. The Quartet gave the premiere of Witold Lutosławski's String Quartet in Stockholm in 1965. György Ligeti dedicated his Second String Quartet to the group, and they premiered it in Baden-Baden on December 14, 1969. The quartet has been credited with the "Zemlinsky Renaissance," as Zemlinsky remained largely unknown until they performed his works. The quartet won the Deutscher Schallplattenpreis for their recording of his four string quartets.  

They also recorded Beethoven's late quartets, Mendelssohn's first two quartets, Schubert's String Quintet D956 with Lynn Harrell, Brahms' first two quartets, and the Ravel and Debussy quartets.

The LaSalle Quartet was the quartet-in-residence at the University of Cincinnati – College-Conservatory of Music, and cellist Lee Fiser taught there until his retirement in 2017.

Members 
Jack Kirstein, cellist from 1955 to 1975, died in August 1995
Henry Meyer, second violin and founding member, became a master teacher, presenting classes throughout the world, and serving as Professor of Violin at the College-Conservatory of Music, Cincinnati for over 25 years. He was the first recipient of the Lifetime Achievement Award of the American Classical Music Hall of Fame. In 1993, Meyer received the A.B. (Dolly) Cohen Award for Excellence in Teaching at the University of Cincinnati. He died in December 2006.
Walter Levin, first violin, lived and worked for many years in Basel, Switzerland, then moved to a senior citizens' home in Chicago. He died in August 2017.
Peter Kamnitzer, viola, died in Israel on February 23, 2016, at the age of 93. He was survived by his wife.
Max Felde, original violist, continued his career in New York City, later moving to the west coast of Canada to raise his family with violinist Aurora Felde. He continued his musical career as assistant principal viola of the CBC Chamber Orchestra, violist in the Vancouver Symphony Orchestra for over 25 years, in addition to being an accomplished classical instrument maker. He died in 2005.
Lee Fiser joined in 1975 with the support of Jack Kirstein and his wife Jeanne, a well-known Cincinnati pianist, when Jack left the Quartet to continue teaching at C.C.M., playing duets with his wife here and abroad, and conducting the Northern Kentucky Symphony, a community orchestra. 
Richard Kapuscinski, violoncello

References

http://holocaustmusic.ort.org/places/camps/death-camps/birkenau/meyerhenry/

American string quartets
Musical groups established in 1946
Musical groups disestablished in 1987
Musical groups from Cincinnati
1946 establishments in Ohio
1987 disestablishments in Ohio